Yelenovka is a rural locality (a selo) in Shramovskoye Rural Settlement, Rossoshansky District, Voronezh Oblast, Russia. The population was 350 as of 2010. There are 6 streets.

References 

Rural localities in Rossoshansky District